The transportation system of Connecticut is a cooperation of complex systems of infrastructure. Trains and highways are the central pieces of the system.

Transit systems

Rail
Southwestern Connecticut is served by MTA's Metro-North Railroad New Haven Line, providing commuter service to New York City and New Haven, with branches servicing New Canaan, Danbury, and Waterbury. Connecticut lies along Amtrak's Northeast Corridor which features frequent Northeast Regional and Acela Express service. Towns between New Haven and New London are also served by the Shore Line East commuter line. Operation of commuter trains from New Haven to Springfield on Amtrak's New Haven-Springfield Line is under consideration. Amtrak also operates a shuttle service between New Haven and Springfield, Massachusetts, servicing Hartford and other towns on the corridor.

Bus
Statewide bus service is supplied by Connecticut Transit, owned by the Connecticut Department of Transportation, with smaller municipal authorities providing local service. Bus networks are an important part of the transportation system in Connecticut, especially in urban areas like Hartford, Stamford, Norwalk, Bridgeport and New Haven. The state also operates CTfastrak, a bus rapid transit line linking New Britain and Hartford.

Roads and freeways

The Interstate highways in the state are I-95 (the majority of the Connecticut Turnpike) traveling southwest to northeast along the coast, I-84 traveling southwest to northeast in the center of the state, I-91 traveling south to north in the center of the state, and I-395 (the rest of the Connecticut Turnpike) traveling south to north near the eastern edge of the state. The other major highways in Connecticut are the Merritt Parkway and Wilbur Cross Parkway, which together form Route 15, traveling from the Hutchinson River Parkway in New York State parallel to I-95 before turning north of New Haven and traveling parallel to I-91, finally becoming a surface road in Berlin. Route 15 and I-95 were originally toll roads; they relied on a system of toll plazas at which all traffic stopped and paid fixed tolls. A series of terrible crashes at these plazas eventually contributed to the decision to remove the tolls in 1988. Other major arteries in the state include U.S. Route 7 (US 7) in the west traveling parallel to the NY state line, Route 8 farther east near the industrial city of Waterbury and traveling south to north along the Naugatuck River Valley nearly parallel with US 7, and Route 9 in the east.

Between New Haven and New York City, I-95 is one of the most congested highways in the United States. Many people now drive longer distances to work in the New York City area. This strains the three lanes of traffic capacity, resulting in lengthy rush hour delays. Frequently, the congestion spills over to clog the parallel Merritt Parkway. The state has encouraged traffic reduction schemes, including rail use and ride-sharing.

Connecticut also has a very active bicycling community, with one of the highest rates of bicycling ownership and use in the United States. New Haven's cycling community, organized in a local advocacy group called ElmCityCycling, is particularly active. According to the U.S. Census 2006 American Community Survey, New Haven has the highest percentage of commuters who bicycle to work of any major metropolitan center on the East Coast.

Bridges and tunnels
The Heroes Tunnel on the Wilbur Cross Parkway is the only tunnel in Connecticut to pass under a natural obstacle, though there are other vehicular tunnels in Hartford and New Haven. Connecticut has many bridges, especially along the coast of Long Island Sound.

Rules of the road

Specific rules of the road in Connecticut, especially those that may differ from those of the United States in general, include:

Passengers
Drivers aged 16 to 17 years are not allowed to have any other passengers besides a driving instructor, parents or legal guardians, or a licensed driver 20 years or older during the first 6 months of having a license.
After 6 months of holding a driver’s license, drivers aged 16 to 17 years are only permitted to have immediate family members as passengers.

Seat belts
The driver and front seat passengers are required to wear seat belts.
Drivers who are 16 or 17 years old and each of their passengers are required to wear seat belts.
People aged under 8, or who weigh less than 60 pounds, must be in a safety seat designed for their height and weight.

Cell phones
It is illegal to use a handheld cell phone or other mobile electronic device while driving or when temporarily stopped. Hands-free devices are permitted.
Drivers aged 16 or 17 years are not permitted to use a cell phone or other electronic device, including hands-free options, while driving unless there is an emergency situation requiring fire or police.

Right-of-way
Generally, pedestrians have the right-of-way in crosswalks. There are crosswalks at every intersection, even if it is not marked by painted lines.
Drivers from any direction must stop for a school bus that is stopped with red lights flashing, unless a median or other physical barrier separates their roadways.

Parking
Parking lights are allowed for parked vehicles only. It is illegal to drive with only parking lights on.
No-parking zones include:
Within 25 feet of a stop sign.
Within 10 feet of a fire hydrant.
More than one foot from the curb

Curfew
Drivers aged 16 to 17 years are not allowed to drive between 11pm and 5am.

Drunk driving
Driving while intoxicated (DWI) is defined as a blood alcohol content of 0.02% for those under 21 years of age, and 0.08% for older drivers.

Move over 
Drivers must move over one lane when it is safe to do so when there is an emergency vehicle, tow truck or road maintenance vehicle with its lights flashing stopped on the road or highway.

Turn on red
A right turn on red is allowed after stopping, unless it is prohibited by a traffic sign. Left turn on red is not permitted.

Horses 
Drivers must slow down or stop if necessary when approaching a horse and rider. Blowing the horn when approaching or even passing a horse is illegal.

Studded tires 
Studded tires are permitted between November 15th and April 30th unless there are signs or other regulations that do not allow them on certain roadways.

Slower vehicles
Motorists who are driving slowly and have several cars behind them must pull over when it is safe to allow them to pass, or increase speed to the posted speed limit.

Headlights 
If wipers are required because of weather conditions, the headlights must be on as well.

Accidents 
Any accident involving property damage, injury or death must be reported to the police.

Port Infrastructure

Airports
Bradley International Airport is located in Windsor Locks, 15 miles (24 km) north of Hartford. Regional air service is provided at Tweed New Haven Regional Airport. Larger civil airports include Danbury Municipal Airport (private planes only) and Waterbury-Oxford Airport in western Connecticut. Sikorsky Memorial Airport is located in Stratford and mostly services cargo, helicopter and private aviation. The Westchester County Airport in Harrison, New York serves much of southwestern Connecticut.

Current, future and proposed projects
The Long Island Sound link is a proposed bridge or tunnel that would link Long Island with either Connecticut or New York across the Long Island Sound. The currently proposed tunnel, however, does not enter Connecticut.

See also
 Plug-in electric vehicles in Connecticut

References

 
Transportation planning
Rules of the road